Ali Loke (née Hemingway) (born 26 May 1993 in Stevenage) is a Welsh professional squash player. She has competed in the main draw of multiple professional PSA tournaments. As of April 2019, she was ranked number 77 in the world and was the 2nd-highest internationally ranked player in Wales.

References
 Economics of Squash: Ali Loke’s Rise And The Equation To Grow Women’s Squash

1993 births
Living people
Welsh female squash players